1st Vinnikovo or Pervoye Vinnikovo is a rural locality and the administrative center of Vinnikovsky Selsoviet Rural Settlement, Kursky District, Kursk Oblast, Russia. Population:

Geography 
The village is located on the Vinogrobl River (a left tributary of the Tuskar in the basin of the Seym), 113 km from the Russia–Ukraine border, 14 km north-east of Kursk.

 Climate
1st Vinnikovo has a warm-summer humid continental climate (Dfb in the Köppen climate classification).

Transport 

The rural locality is situated 14 km from Kursk Vostochny Airport, 128 km from Belgorod International Airport and 189 km from Voronezh Peter the Great Airport.

References

Notes

Sources

Rural localities in Kursky District, Kursk Oblast